Siedliczka is a small river of the Wkrzańska Forest in northwestern Poland, near the town of Police.

See also
Sołtysi

References

Rivers of Poland